Environment Wales is a partnership of voluntary organisations in Wales, whose aim it is to contribute to sustainable development, mainly by awarding grants for projects which contribute to this aim.

The organisations are:
Cylch - Wales Community Recycling Network
BTCV Cymru
Groundwork Wales
Keep Wales Tidy
The National Trust in Wales
Wales Council for Voluntary Action
West Wales Eco Centre
Wildlife Trusts Wales

See also
Environmental issues in Wales
Renewable energy in Wales
Wales Green Party

External links
Environment Wales website
Environment Wales blog

Environmental organisations based in Wales